Breakin' Up Winter is an old-time music 'retreat', a gathering of old-time string band musicians that began the first weekend of March, 1994.  It eschews the contest approach common to the larger festivals. It brings together hundreds of old-time musicians in a state park setting where the first focus is on educational programs and presentations by scholars and icons of the old-time music worlds.  And, of course, jamming.  It is presented by the Nashville Old-Time String Band Association, a 501(c)(3) nonprofit organization that began as an offshoot of a community education class in Nashville, Tennessee.

History
The first Breakin' Up Winter retreat was just that - an informal gathering of friends who shared an interest in and love for old-time string band music.  Fresh from another small old-time gathering in Athens, Alabama, they wanted to create that same atmosphere in Middle Tennessee.  The first gathering was held in the Cedar Forest Lodge of the Cedars of Lebanon State Park near Lebanon, Tennessee, about 30 miles outside Nashville.  The retreat continues at Cedars of Lebanon, but now encompasses the entire state park. Legendary old-time fiddler Charlie Acuff was a guest of honor at that first event and has been a central artist through the years.

Scholars and artists
Charlie Acuff was the first in a long line of widely respected "heritage artists" - icons of old-time music - to headline Breakin' Up Winter. There developed a theme for the first day of the event - 'Roots of Old-Time Music' - that brings in noted researchers, authors, and performers.  

Noted traditional music researcher/author/folklorist Charles Wolfe was a mainstay until his untimely death in 2006.

Each year, the event begins with scholarly presentations by researchers and authors and demonstrations by musicians with deep roots in the music.

"Participatory music like old-time music involves a great deal of gifting—passing along tunes, playing with others, learning from others, sharing, and coming together for events such as Breakin’ Up Winter to do all of this," writes Jeff Todd Titon, professor of ethnomusicology at Brown University.

In addition to Charlie Acuff and Charles Wolfe, presenters and performers have included: 
Alan Jabbour
Bill Mansfield
Bruce Greene
Clyde Davenport
Dan Gellert
Don Pedi
Evan Hatch
Franklin George
Gerry Milnes
George Gruhn
J.P. Fraley
James Bryan
Jim Griffith
John Harrod
Joyce Cauthen
Mike Seeger
Kerry Blech
Paul Wells
Ralph Blizard
Ron Pen
Will Keys
Walt Haden

The Focus: Old-time String Band Music 
Some call it "mountain music" or "old-timey" or "fiddle tunes."  It's the heart of this retreat and the mission of the Nashville Old-Time String Band Association: ". . . to preserve, promote, and perform old-time string band music."  

A flurry of interest in "old-time" music in the 1940s, and the folk music revival of the 1960s and 1970s, brought millions of new listeners to this traditional music.  

But in the hills and hollows of Appalachia and many communities beyond, it did not need reviving.  It remained the music that people learned to play knee-to-knee with musicians who learned it the same way. There remain many players whose introduction to the music came (and still comes) not from radio or recordings, but through family and friends who themselves who were passing it down directly through the generations. 

It is to those roots of old-time music that this retreat reaches and which is the focus of the first day of the event.

In 2008, NOTSBA began presenting its Heritage Award to musicians. The first went to Charlie Acuff, the second to Clyde Davenport, the third to Franklin George. The fourth will be presented in 2010 to Lester McCumbers.

See also
List of bluegrass music festivals

References

External links
Nashville Old-Time String Band Association
Field Recorders Collective Detailed stories of many old time musicians on the notes page.
Old-Time Banjo and music of Rural America
Old Time Fiddlers Hall of Fame
Appalachian Traditional Music: A Short History
Old-Time Herald Magazine
Old-Time Music in Portland, Oregon
Old Time Music Source list
Sheet music, lyrics & midis for 200+ traditional old-time songs

Music festivals in Tennessee
Old-time music festivals